Pangani Magharibi  is an administrative ward in the Pangani District of the Tanga Region in Tanzania. According to the 2012 census, the ward has a population of 6,262.

References

Wards of Pangani District
Wards of Tanga Region